Tropaeolum azureum is a species of perennial plant in the family Tropaeolaceae. It is endemic to mountainous regions of Chile. It is a small climber, around 1M long.

References

azureum